Selknam or Selk'nam may refer to:

Selk'nam people, an indigenous group in South America.
Selknam (rugby union), a rugby union team in Chile.
Selk'nam language, also known as the Ona language, which is the language spoken by Selk'nam people.